= Nangal Salempur =

- Village
- Location in Punjab, India Nangal Salempur (India)
- Coordinates: 31.3707365°N 75.6044204°E
- Country: India
- State: Punjab
- District: Jalandhar
- Tehsil: Jalandhar - I

Government
  - Type: Panchayat raj
  - Body: Gram panchayat

Area
  - Total: 106.24 ha (262.5 acres)

Population (2011)
  - Total: 891; 460/431 ♂/♀
  - Scheduled Castes: 502; 255/247 ♂/♀
  - Total Households: 189

Languages
  - Official: Punjabi
- Time zone: UTC+5:30 (IST)
- Telephone: 144012
- ISO 3166 code: IN-PB
- Vehicle registration: PB-08
- Post office: Reru S.O
- Website: jalandhar.gov.in

Nangal Salempur is a village in Jalandhar - I in Jalandhar district of Punjab State, India. It is located 10 kilometres (6.2 mi) from district headquarters. The village is administrated by Sarpanch an elected representative of the village.

== Demography ==
As of 2011, the village has a total number of 189 houses and a population of 891, of which 460 are males while 431 are females. According to the report published by Census India in 2011, out of the total population of the village, 502 people are from Schedule Caste and the village does not have any Schedule Tribe population so far.

== See also ==
- List of villages in India
